Omer Smet (13 December 1890 – 12 July 1984) was a Belgian sprinter. He competed in the men's 4 × 100 metres relay at the 1920 Summer Olympics.

References

1890 births
1984 deaths
Athletes (track and field) at the 1920 Summer Olympics
Belgian male sprinters
Belgian male hurdlers
Olympic athletes of Belgium
Place of birth missing